Surni-ye Olya (also Romanized as Sūrnī-ye ‘Olyā, Soorenié Olya, and Sūrenī-ye ‘Olyā; also known as Sūrīni, Sūrīnī-ye ‘Olyā, Sūrnī-ye Bālā, and Sūrnīyeh-ye Bālā) is a village in Razavar Rural District, in the Central District of Kermanshah County, Kermanshah Province, Iran. At the 2006 census, its population was 265, in 65 families.

References 

Populated places in Kermanshah County